

The Academy of Sciences, Humanities and Arts of Lyon (French: Académie des Sciences, Belles-Lettres et Arts de Lyon) is a French learned society founded in 1700. Its founders included:
 Claude Brossette, lawyer, alderman of Lyons, and administrator of the Hôtel-Dieu de Lyon;
 Laurent Dugas, President of the Cour des monnaies;
 , future consulting physician of King Louis XIV and member of the Académie des Inscriptions et Belles-Lettres;
 Antoine de Serre, adviser to the Cour des monnaies;
 , naturalist;
 Father Jean de Saint-Bonnet, professor at the Collège-lycée Ampère.
 Thomas Bernard Fellon.

Notable Members
 Joseph D'Aquin
 Jean Pouilloux

See also
 French art salons and academies

Notes

References

National academies
Learned societies of France
1700 establishments in France
Organizations established in 1700